Point Frederick is a suburb of the Central Coast region of New South Wales, Australia on a peninsula protruding into Brisbane Water  south-southeast of Gosford's central business district. It is part of the  local government area.

Pioneer Park 
Point Frederick is one of the oldest areas on the Central Coast and is also home to Pioneer Park. Pioneer Park has great historical significance and hosts a graveyard in which various inhabitants of the point were buried long ago. Pioneer Park is also a popular outing place for tourists, and many families, to enjoy picnics.

References

Suburbs of the Central Coast (New South Wales)